Iron Storm can refer to:

Iron Storm (1995 video game), a turn-based strategy game in the Daisenryaku series published by Working Designs
Iron Storm (2002 video game), a first-person shooter developed by Wanadoo Edition
 Iron Storm (album)

See also
Ion Storm, an American video game developer